Křižany is a municipality and village in Liberec District in the Liberec Region of the Czech Republic. It has about 800 inhabitants.

Administrative parts
The village of Žibřidice is an administrative part of Křižany.

History
The first written mention of Křižany is from 1352, then under its former name Suchá.

Notable people
Josef Vacke (1907–1987), artist and painter; lived here

References

External links

Villages in Liberec District